Hemileuca slosseri, the nit-grass moth or Slosser's buckmoth, is a species of moth in the family Saturniidae. It was described by Richard S. Peigler and Stephen E. Stone in 1989 and is found in North America.

The MONA or Hodges number for Hemileuca slosseri is 7744.4.

References

 Tuskes, Paul M., James P. Tuttle, and Michael M. Collins (1996). The Wild Silk Moths of North America: A Natural History of the Saturniidae of the United States and Canada, ix + 250.

Further reading

 Arnett, Ross H. (2000). American Insects: A Handbook of the Insects of America North of Mexico. CRC Press.

External links

 Butterflies and Moths of North America
 NCBI Taxonomy Browser, Hemileuca slosseri

Hemileucinae
Moths described in 1989